Penicillium desertorum is a species of the genus of Penicillium which was isolated from desert soil under the plant Oryzopsis hymenoides in Wyoming in the US.

See also
 List of Penicillium species

References 

desertorum
Fungi described in 2012